The men's team pursuit at the 2008 Summer Olympics took place between August 17 and 18, at the Laoshan Velodrome.

Qualification 
Great Britain automatically qualified a team because of their victory at the 2008 UCI Track Cycling World Championships. They also won the late 2007 World Cup event in Sydney, affording another place based on UCI rankings. This extra place was given to Colombia. No B World Championship was held in this event.

Competition format 
The men's team pursuit race consists of a 4 km race between two teams of four cyclists, starting on opposite sides of the track.  If one team catches the other, the race is over.

The tournament consisted of an initial qualifying round.  The top four teams in the qualifying round remained in contention for the gold medal, the 5th to 8th place teams could compete for a possible bronze, and the remaining teams were eliminated.

In the first round of match competition, teams were seeded into matches based on their times from the qualifying round. The fastest team faced the eighth-fastest, the second-fastest faced the seventh, and so forth. Winners advanced to the finals while losers in each match received a final ranking based on their time in the round.  Advancement to the bronze medal final was based solely on time, with the fastest two teams among the six qualifiers who had not advanced to the gold medal final reaching the bronze medal final.

Schedule 
All times are China standard time (UTC+8)

Results

Qualification

Match round

Semifinals
Qualification rule: Two fastest teams advance to the gold medal match (Q), while the next two to the bronze medal match (q).

Medal round
Bronze medal match

Gold medal match

References

External links
NBC Olympics: Cycling

Track cycling at the 2008 Summer Olympics
Cycling at the Summer Olympics – Men's team pursuit
Men's events at the 2008 Summer Olympics